Loggerheads is a village and civil parish in north-west Staffordshire, England, on the A53 between Market Drayton and Newcastle-under-Lyme.

Name

The village takes its name from that of the public house, which used to be known as The Three Loggerheads (meaning "The Three Fools") 
and is now simply The Loggerheads.

History
The village is close to the border with Shropshire and Cheshire. It has a Telford postcode and a Shropshire address, but is governed by the Newcastle-under-Lyme Borough Council in Staffordshire. Historically the modern parish of Loggerheads lay within the Township (for tithes) of Drayton in Hales. 
 
Loggerheads was home to the Cheshire Joint Sanatorium, a tuberculosis sanitorium, which stood in the  Burntwood woodland. It was opened in the 1920s and the last two patients were discharged in October 1969. The premises stood empty for a few years until Newcastle-under-Lyme Borough Council purchased the site for redevelopment in 1977.

The Burntwood, part of the Blore Forest, was once a large oak woodland but is now predominantly coniferous. The oak trees were removed to make way for the quicker growing softwoods which are of more commercial value.

The village of Ashley, Staffordshire is adjacent. The village has a large number of listed buildings.

Schools
 The Hugo Meynell Primary School
 St Mary's School Mucklestone: website

Other places nearby
Market Drayton
Whitmore
Woore
Croxton
Eccleshall
Mucklestone

See also
Listed buildings in Loggerheads, Staffordshire

References

External links

 Whats On in and around loggerheads
 Loggerheads Community Information Shop
 The Turner Hodgkiss Community Nature Reserve

Villages in Staffordshire
Borough of Newcastle-under-Lyme
Civil parishes in Staffordshire
Tuberculosis sanatoria in the United Kingdom